Oi (Portuguese for "Hi"), formerly known as Telemar, is the largest fixed telephone operator and the fourth mobile telephone operator in Brazil, being the third largest telecommunication company in Latin America. It is headquartered in Rio de Janeiro.

In 2013, Oi announced its merger with Portugal Telecom, the largest telecommunication company in Portugal, in order to strengthen the Brazilian firm and simplify its ownership structure. In June 2015 Portugal Telecom was acquired by Altice Group.

On June 20, 2016, Oi filed for a 19 billion (65 billion) bankruptcy protection, the largest on record for Brazil.

In March 2017, Oi had 63 million revenue generating units (UGRs), including 40 million for personal mobile service, 16.3 million for landline, 6.5 million for B2B (large corporations and microentrepreneurs). Nowadays, it has 2 million hotspots to Oi WIFI network around Brazil.

In March 2019, Oi reported a fourth-quarter net loss of 3.359 billion reais ($858 million), widening 66 percent from its year-earlier loss. Total revenue fell 7.9 percent.

On February 8, 2023, Oi once again filed for Chapter 15 bankruptcy in the United States.

Corporate governance
Oi's chief executive officer (as of January 2018) is Eurico Teles, who also serves as the company's chief financial officer and director of investor relations.

History

Oi (then known as Telemar) was formed as Tele Norte Leste to merge sixteen state-owned incumbent local exchange carriers, during the privatization of Brazilian telecommunications system. Each carrier served a particular Brazilian state in the northern, northeastern and southeastern part of the country. In the break-up of Telebras in 1998 it was sold to a consortium led by the Brazilian construction firm Andrade Gutierrez (21.2%) and Inepar Holdings (20%) as well as other Brazilian corporate and individual investors. The consortium paid 3.434 billion reais.

The states that formed the base of Telemar at its inception were Rio de Janeiro, Minas Gerais, Espírito Santo, Bahia, Sergipe, Alagoas, Pernambuco, Paraíba, Rio Grande do Norte, Piauí, Ceará, Maranhão, Pará, Amazonas, Amapá and Roraima, corresponding to 65% of the Brazilian territory and 20 million households.

Initially, Telemar was allowed to offer only local voice and data services and interstate long-distance voice services. Today, Telemar and its subsidiaries offer local, long-distance and international voice and data services, besides a growing mobile phone network.

In April 2006, it was announced that Telemar would restructure itself, merging its three holding companies into a single company, that would have been named either Telemar Participações S.A. or Oi Participações S.A. However, those plans failed, since there was no consensus between Telemar shareholders. But on March 1, 2007, Telemar rebranded itself to "Oi", unifying all of its companies and services under the Oi umbrella. The company is still legally known as "Telemar Norte Leste S.A.", "Tele Norte Leste Participações S.A." and "Telemar Participações S.A.". Oi owns the brands:
 Oi Fixo (landline service, formerly Telefone Telemar)
 Oi Móvel (mobile service, cornerstone of the Oi brand)
 Oi Velox (ADSL, 3G formerly Velox)
 Oi Internet (ISP)
 31 (long-distance and international calling)
 Oi Wi-Fi (Wi-Fi access, at home or via hotspots)
 Oi TV (DTH pay TV)
 Oi Voip (Voice over IP)

In 2010, Portugal Telecom acquired 22.4% of Oi shares.

In February 2014, Oi announced it would raise $5.9 billion in a share offering as part of the firm's merger process with Portugal Telecom.

In October 2021, Oi delisted its ADRs from the New York Stock Exchange.

Subsidiaries

Oi Móvel
Oi launched its mobile network in 2002 in its license states. It was the first network using GSM in Brazil. Oi has the practice of not calling its phones "cell phones", but rather "Ois". In 2007, Oi started selling only unlocked handsets, focusing on SIM card and plan sales. In October 2007, Oi acquired a license to operate with GSM in São Paulo, where the network went live on October 24, 2008. In December 2007, Oi purchased licenses to operate a 3G network in its area, including São Paulo, but with the exception of the Franca area. That network is expected to go live in 2009. Also in December 2007, Oi announced its purchase of Amazônia Celular, which was a condition of the sale of its sister company, Telemig Celular, to Vivo.

Oi Internet
Oi Internet is an ISP that was launched in 2004. Oi Internet started services with a promotion that offered 31% off the dial-up connection costs on the subscriber's bill. However, Anatel, the Brazilian telecom regulator, did not allow this practice. Later, the ISP relaunched the promotion, offering 31% of the dial-up connection costs deposited in the subscriber's bank account or twice of that on a prepaid Oi phone. The Oi Internet dial-up dialer can send SMS messages to Oi phones.

In early 2005, Oi Internet launched its broadband services, initially available only for Oi's Oi Velox DSL subscribers, but now also available for Brasil Telecom Turbo and Telefónica Speedy subscribers.

Brasil Telecom purchase
In 2008, Oi announced it would purchase Brasil Telecom, creating a major Brazilian telecommunications company, already nicknamed "Supertele" or "SuperOi". That takeover required changes in legislation, which at the time prohibited a fixed telephone company from purchasing another fixed telephone company in a different license area. That legislation has changed since, and Oi completed its purchase of Brasil Telecom on January 9, 2009. Rollout of the Oi brand in the Brasil Telecom area starts with prepaid mobile service on May 17, 2009.

Criticism
Oi has been criticized and fined by Anatel due to not being able to meet quality goals in their mobile phone service; they have also been criticized for poor customer service.

Sponsorships
Brazilian Olympic Committee
Sandro Dias
São Paulo Fashion Week (Spring/Summer 2009 edition)
Fashion Rio - Rio Fashion Week
2007 Pan American Games, held in Rio de Janeiro
Oi Casa Grande - teatro no Rio de Janeiro
Oi FM - online radio station
Oi Fashion Rocks Brasil 2009, 2010
X Games Brasil
2014 FIFA World Cup Brazil

Slogans
 2002-2013: Simples assim. ("It's that simple.")
 2013–2015: A Oi completa você. ("Oi completes you.")
 2015-2016: Porque o seu mundo não para. ("Because your world doesn't stop.")
 2016–present: Junto é bem melhor ("Together, it's much better")

See also

 Telecommunications in Brazil
 List of internet service providers in Brazil

References

External links
 Oi website

Brazilian brands
Companies listed on B3 (stock exchange)
Companies formerly listed on the New York Stock Exchange
Telecommunications companies established in 1998
Companies based in Rio de Janeiro (state)
Telecommunications companies of Brazil
Internet service providers of Brazil
Mobile phone companies of Brazil
Companies that have filed for bankruptcy in Brazil
Companies that filed for Chapter 11 bankruptcy in 2016
Companies that filed for Chapter 11 bankruptcy in 2023